Hoover High School may refer to:

Herbert Hoover High School (Fresno, California)
Herbert Hoover High School (Glendale), California
Herbert Hoover High School (San Diego, California)
Herbert Hoover High School (Iowa), in Des Moines, Iowa
Herbert Hoover High School (West Virginia), in Clendenin, West Virginia
Hoover High School (Alabama), Hoover, Alabama, made famous by the MTV show Two-A-Days
Hoover High School (North Canton, Ohio)